We Happy Few is a 2004 play by Imogen Stubbs.  It follows a group of female actors touring Shakespeare plays round the United Kingdom during World War II.  It is based on the Nancy Hewins' touring group, the Osiris Players.  Its title quotes the St Crispin's Day Speech from Henry V.

Premiere
Originally written and performed in 2003 at Malvern Theatres, it was further developed into the play which opened in London in 2004. The play was based on the Osiris Players who were the first professional all-woman theatre company founded by Nancy Hewins.

The play's London premiere was directed by Stubbs' husband Trevor Nunn at the Gielgud Theatre and starred Juliet Stevenson and Patsy Palmer.  It opened on Tuesday 29 June 2004 but, though planned to run to November 2004, poor audience figures and critical or lukewarm reviews led to it closing  at the end of July 2004. The play was again performed in Malvern in 2012.

Original cast
Juliet Stevenson - Hettie Oaks, leader of the troupe
Marcia Warren - Flora Pelmet, co-founder of the troupe
Kate O'Mara - Helen, alcoholic children's radio presenter and frustrated actress
Patsy Palmer - Charlotte, Cockney tomboy, latterly Rosalind's girlfriend
Caroline Blakiston - Jocelyn, stage manager
Paul Bentley - Reggie Pelmet, Flora's cousin
Rosemary McHale - Gertrude, German Jewish refugee
Adam Davy - Joseph Rosenbaum, Gertrude's son
Cat Simmons - Ivy, Joseph's girlfriend
Emma Darwall-Smith - Rosalind, new RADA graduate, Helen's daughter

Publication
The play was published (and is licensed for amateur performance) by Nick Hern Books, London.

Notes

External links
Review of the play's premiere

2004 plays